Haimi Fenichel (born 1972) is an Israeli  sculptor and installation artist.

Biography
Haimi Fenichel was named for his uncle, Haim Fenichel, who was killed in the Six-Day War in 1967 and received the a medal of honor after his death. Fenichel studied at Bezalel Academy of Art and Design in Jerusalem and the Academy of Arts, Architecture and Design in Prague.

Art career
In his exhibit "Mound," Fenichel produces a space that resembles a building site but projects a sense of impending ruin. He plays with materials in a way that creates new combinations and  hybrids that are both familiar and alien. The artist says the work is about time and what it is made out of. "Mound" is a combination construction site-archaeological dig created from hardened sand.

2008: 
"Bizarre Perfection" in Israel Museum in Jerusalem.
"Exposición de las obras ganadoras y finalistas del III Concurso de Pintura y Escultura Figurativas" Foundation Fran Dural, Madrid
2006:
Jerusalem, The Israel Museum, Mini Israel
London, Ben Uri Gallery, The London Jewish Museum, Israeli Contemporary Applied Arts
2005:
Petach Tikva, Israel - Petach Tikva Museum of Art, Transpositions
Kfar Vradim - Tal Gallery, My Personal Box

Awards and recognition
2008: Grand Jury Award, III Concurso de Pintura y Escultura Figurativas, Foundation Fran Dural, Barcelona.
2007: The Haifa Museum of Art, Prizes in Art and Design and Young Artist Award from the Ministry of Science, Culture and Sport
2005: Winner, Alix de Rothschild Craft Award 
 
His work is in the collection of the Israel Museum, Jerusalem.

See also
Visual arts in Israel

References

External links
Haimi Fenichel website

1972 births
Israeli sculptors
Living people
Academy of Arts, Architecture and Design in Prague alumni